Clallam Transit is the public transportation provider for Clallam County, Washington. It provides 12 fixed-route buses, and coordinates with nearby transit organizations to provide 2 intercounty commuter bus lines. It also provides paratransit for disabled riders.

History

The Clallam County Public Transportation Benefit Area (PTBA) was formed on July 24, 1979, using a 0.3 percent sales tax approved by local voters. The following year, Clallam Transit began operating bus service on ten routes across eastern Clallam County. In 1983, the western half of the county voted to be annexed into the system.

In 2011, Clallam Transit opened a new, $15.4 million transit center in downtown Port Angeles.

Clallam Transit debuted its "Strait Shot" intercity bus route in June 2017, connecting Port Angeles to the Bainbridge Island ferry terminal and other points in Kitsap County.

Routes

Intracounty 
Route 10 Joyce - Port Angeles to Joyce
Route 14 Forks - Port Angeles to Forks
Route 15 LaPush - Forks to LaPush
Route 16 Clallam Bay - Forks to Neah Bay
Route 17 Forks Shuttle - Forks loop
Route 20 College/Plaza - Port Angeles loop, via Peninsula College
Route 22 Lincoln/Peabody - Port Angeles loop, via Courthouse
Route 24 Cherry Hill - Port Angeles loop, via Shane Park
Route 26 West Side - Port Angeles loop, West side
Route 30 Highway 101 Commuter - Port Angeles to Sequim
Route 40 Sequim Shuttle - Sequim loop
Route 52 Diamond Point - Sequim to Diamond Point

Intercounty 
 West Jefferson Transit Connection - Forks to Aberdeen
 Jefferson Transit Connection (Route 8 Sequim) - Sequim to Port Townsend
 Route 123 "Strait Shot" - Port Angeles to Bainbridge Island

References

External links 
 Official Site

Bus transportation in Washington (state)
Transportation in Clallam County, Washington